Challapampa is a small town in Isla del Sol, Bolivia. In 2009 it had an estimated population of 435. The town neighbors the ruins called Chinkana, a former Incan settlement.

References

Populated places in La Paz Department (Bolivia)